The Akaflieg München Mü1 Vogel Roch is a glider that was designed and built in Germany in 1924.

Development 
Akaflieg München's first project, the Mü1 Vogel Roch (the Roc Bird), was designed and built shortly after the formation of the Fliegergruppe in 1924 at Hersching am Ammersee. The flying boat glider had a boat shaped hull, parasol mounted swept wings, open cockpit and a prominent fin, with wooden construction throughout. The  Mü1 Vogel Roch was launched from a slipway on the Ammersee and towed into the air by a speedboat for flight testing.

Specifications (Mü1 Vogel Roch)

See also

References

Mu01
1920s German sailplanes
Flying boats
Parasol-wing aircraft
Aircraft first flown in 1924